Washington's 25th legislative district is one of forty-nine districts in Washington state for representation in the state legislature. 

The district includes Puyallup and the surrounding area in Pierce County. 

The district's legislators are state senator Chris Gildon and state representatives Kelly Chambers (position 1) and Cyndy Jacobsen (position 2), all Republicans.

See also
Washington Redistricting Commission
Washington State Legislature
Washington State Senate
Washington House of Representatives

References

External links
Washington State Redistricting Commission
Washington House of Representatives
Map of Legislative Districts

25
Pierce County, Washington